
AD 93 (XCIII) was a common year starting on Tuesday (link will display the full calendar) of the Julian calendar. At the time, it was known as the Year of the Consulship of Pompeius and Priscinus (or, less frequently, year 846 Ab urbe condita). The denomination AD 93 for this year has been used since the early medieval period, when the Anno Domini calendar era became the prevalent method in Europe for naming years.

Events

By place

Roman Empire 
 Emperor Domitian persecutes the Christians.
 Pliny the Younger is named a praetor.

Asia 
 The Xianbei incorporates 100,000 Xiongnu, and establishes the Xianbei State in Mongolia (approximate date).

By topic

Literature 
 Josephus completes his Jewish Antiquities (or in AD 94).

Deaths 
 August 23 – Gnaeus Julius Agricola, Roman general and governor (b. AD 40)
 Arulenus Rusticus, Roman politician and Stoic philosopher (executed)
 Herennius Senecio, Roman Stoic philosopher and writer (executed)
 Lucius Antistius Rusticus, Roman politician and governor

References 

0093